Martin Schiller (born 8 March 1982) is an Austrian professional basketball coach who most recently served as head coach of Casademont Zaragoza of the Liga ACB in Spain.

Coaching career
Schiller, the son of an Austrian father and a British mother, moved to Germany with his family when he was ten years old and then grew up in the Hamburg area, where he played basketball in the youth set up of TSG Bergedorf. He studied at the German Sport University Cologne, while coaching youth teams and working as assistant coach at 2. Bundesliga side Düsseldorf Magics. Schiller subsequently worked for WBC Wels in Austria.

From 2010 until 2015, he served as an assistant coach for the Artland Dragons, and afterwards for the Riesen Ludwigsburg of the Basketball Bundesliga (BBL). On 23 August 2017 Schiller was named the head coach of the Salt Lake City Stars of the NBA G League. Schiller has also been an assistant coach for the German national team since 2015, where he worked with Jazz assistant coach Alex Jensen. 

Schiller was named the NBA G League Coach of the Year for the 2019–20 season after leading the Stars to a 30–12 record.

On 14 July 2020 Schiller was announced as the new head coach of BC Žalgiris. Under Schiller's guidance, the team won the 2021 Lithuanian championship as well as the cup title. On 8 October 2021 Schiller was fired by Žalgiris. According to the club, the decision was taken, because the team did not play "at the level that everybody wants to see". In EuroLeague play, Žalgiris had lost its first two games of the 2021-22 season, while the team was unbeaten in the LKL (4-0), when Schiller was dismissed.

He was named head coach of Casademont Zaragoza of the Spanish Liga ACB on 24 June 2022. On October 18, 2022, Schiller was sacked by Zaragoza after hardly four months in the job. Schiller coached the team in the opening four games of the 2022-23 ACB season, which all ended in defeat.

References

1982 births
Living people
Artland Dragons coaches
Austrian basketball coaches
Austrian expatriate sportspeople in the United States
Riesen Ludwigsburg coaches
Salt Lake City Stars coaches
Sportspeople from Vienna